PISO algorithm (Pressure-Implicit with Splitting of Operators) was proposed by Issa in 1986 without iterations and with large time steps and a lesser computing effort. It is an extension of the SIMPLE algorithm used in computational fluid dynamics to solve the Navier-Stokes equations. PISO is a pressure-velocity calculation procedure for the Navier-Stokes equations developed originally for non-iterative computation of unsteady compressible flow, but it has been adapted successfully to steady-state problems.

PISO involves one predictor step and two corrector steps and is designed to satisfy mass conservation using predictor-corrector steps.

Algorithm steps

The algorithm can be summed up as follows:
Set the boundary conditions.
Solve the discretized momentum equation to compute an intermediate velocity field.
Compute the mass fluxes at the cells faces.
Solve the pressure equation.
Correct the mass fluxes at the cell faces.
Correct the velocities on the basis of the new pressure field.
Update the boundary conditions.
Repeat from 3 for the prescribed number of times.
Increase the time step and repeat from 1.

As already seen for the SIMPLE algorithm, the steps 4 and 5 can be repeated for a prescribed number of times to correct for non-orthogonality.

Predictor step

Guess the pressure field  and get velocity field components  and  using discretized momentum equation. The initial guess for the pressure may or may not be correct. 
Corrector step 1Velocity component obtained from predictor step may not satisfy the continuity equation, so we define correction factors p',v',u'  for the pressure field and velocity field.

where ;     :correct pressure field and velocity component 
 :correction in pressure field and correction in velocity components 
 :guessed pressure field and velocity component
We define  as above.

Corrector step 2
In piso another corrector step can be used.
    ;    
     ;     
     ;    
where :  are the correct pressure field and the correct velocity components, respectively
Set  
where;  are correct pressure and velocity field

Advantages and disadvantages
 Generally gives more stable results and takes less CPU time but not suitable for all processes.
 Suitable numerical schemes for solving the pressure-velocity linked equation.
 For laminar backward facing step PISO is faster than SIMPLE but it is slower concerning flow through heated fin.
 If momentum and scalar equation have weak or no coupling then PISO is better than SIMPLEC.
 PISO is most time effective method

See also
Fluid mechanics
Computational fluid dynamics
Algorithm
SIMPLE algorithm
SIMPLER algorithm
SIMPLEC algorithm

References
 An Introduction to Computational Fluid Dynamics The Finite Volume Method, 2/e By Versteeg  
 Computational Fluid Dynamics for Engineers by Bengt Andersson, Ronnie Andersson, Love Håkansson, Mikael Mortensen, Rahman Sudiyo, Berend van Wachem 
 Computational Fluid Dynamics in Fire Engineering: Theory, Modelling and Practice by Guan Heng Yeoh, Kwok Kit Yuen 
 http://openfoamwiki.net/index.php/OpenFOAM_guide/The_PISO_algorithm_in_OpenFOAM
 Computational fluid dynamics by T. J. Chung, University of Alabama in Huntsville 
 Computational method for fluid dynamics by Joel H.Ferziger,Milovan Peric 
 Solution of the implicitly discretized fluid flow equations by operator-splitting, Journal of Computational Physics 62 by R. Issa 

Computational fluid dynamics